Karezan Rural District is a rural district (dehestan) in Karezan District, Sirvan County, Ilam Province, Iran. At the 2006 census, its population was 4,593, in 929 families.  The rural district has 15 villages.  The village is populated by Kurds from the khezel tribe.

References 

Rural Districts of Ilam Province
Sirvan County